Mariyadhai is a 2009 Indian Tamil-language drama film starring Vijayakanth in a dual role as father and son. Meena and Meera Jasmine are the heroines, while Ambika also plays a significant role. Directed by Vikraman, the film was released on 24 April 2009 and received mixed reviews from critics and audience.

Plot
The story unfolds in a small village near Pollachi. Annamalai leads a contended life with his wife Alamelu, daughter Sumathy and son Pichai. Annamalai, being a caring and loving father, even allows his son to change his name from Pichai to Raja when the latter was ridiculed by his friends when he was young. Respected in the village for his philanthropy, Annamalai gives enough liberties and freedom to his son, who becomes an agriculture graduate. All troubles begin when Raja loses money by cultivating dates in the barren land owned by his father. Meanwhile, an industrialist eyes the land for setting up chemical factory which is resisted by both the father and son. Raja comes across Radha, a music teacher, and he falls for her immediately. Raja's wedding is arranged with Radha by elders of both the families. Two days before their wedding, Raja gives up his property to Radha to bail her out of trouble, little realizing that it was a practical joke hatched by Radha to take away his land. Their wedding gets stopped. Raja vows to get back the land. Chandra enters Raja's life. She learns of his bad past and vows to change his heart and marry him. Eventually, it is how Raja comes up in his life and marry Chandra.

Cast

Soundtrack
The music was composed by Vijay Antony.

Reception

Rediff wrote that "Mariyadhai is full of stock situations and trite dialogues but can satisfy Vijayakanth's fans".

References

External links

2009 drama films
Indian drama films
2009 films
2000s Tamil-language films
Films scored by Vijay Antony